Nationality words link to articles with information on the nation's poetry or literature (for instance, Irish or France).

Events
Hélène van Zuylen leaves her partner, English-born French poet Renée Vivien, for another woman.

Works published in English

Canada
 Peter McArthur, The Prodigal and other Poems
 Robert W. Service, Songs of a Sourdough (published in the United States as The Spell of the Yukon and Other Verses), including "The Shooting of Dan McGrew" and "The Cremation of Sam McGee", Scottish-born poet resident in Canada
 Arthur Stringer, The Woman in the Rain, and Other Poems
 Arthur Wentworth, Hamilton Eaton, The Lotus of the Nile and Other Poems
 Agnes Ethelwyn Wetherald, The Last Robin: Lyrics and Sonnets

United Kingdom
 Gordon Bottomley, Chambers of Imagery
 Joseph Campbell, The Gilly of Christ
 Ethel Carnie, Rhymes from the Factory
 Padraic Colum, Wild Earth
 John Davidson, God and Mammon
 W. H. Davies, New Poems
 Ernest Dowson (died 1900), Cynara: a Little Book of Verse
 James Elroy Flecker, The Bridge of Fire
 Ford Madox Ford:
 An English Girl
 From Inland, and Other Poems
 James Joyce, Chamber Music
 Alfred Noyes, The Hill of Dreams
 Dora Sigerson, Collected Poems

United States
 Witter Bynner, An Ode to Harvard and Other Poems
 Lizelia Augusta Jenkins Moorer, Prejudice Unveiled
 Sara Teasdale, Sonnets to Duse and Other Poems

Works published in other languages

France
 Paul Claudel:
 Art poétique
 Connaissance de l'Est ("Knowledge of the East"), expanded from the original 1900 edition
 Partage de midi
 Processionnal pour saluer le siècle nouveau ("Processional for the New Century")
 Saint-Pol-Roux, pen name of Paul Roux, Les Reposoirs de la procession, published starting in 1893 and ending this year
 Renée Vivien, pen name of Pauline Tarn, Flambeaux éteints ("Extinguished Torches")

Other languages
 Delmira Agustini, El libro blanco, Uruguay
 Stefan George, Der siebente Ring ("The Seventh Ring"); German
 Peider Lansel, Primulas, Romansh language, Switzerland
 Antonio Machado, Soledades, galerías, y otros poemas ("Solitudes, Galleries, and Other Poems"); Spain
 Gregorio Martínez Sierra, La casa de primavera ("The House of Spring"), Spain
 Rainer Maria Rilke, New Poems (Neue Gedichte), German

Births
Death years link to the corresponding "[year] in poetry" article:
 January 24 – Francis Brabazon (died 1984), Australian
 January 30 – Jun Takami 高見順  pen-name of Takama Yoshioa (died 1965), Japanese Shōwa period novelist and poet
 February 1 – Günter Eich (died 1972), German poet, dramatist and author
 February 21 – W. H. Auden (died 1973), English-born United States
 March 18 – Luis Gabriel Portillo (died 1993), Spanish Republican professor and poet
 April 29 – Chūya Nakahara 中原 中也 (died 1937), Japanese early Shōwa period poet
 April 30 – Jacob Hiegentlich (suicide 1940), gay Dutch Jewish writer, also writing poetry in German
 May 4 – Lincoln Kirstein (died 1996), American cultural figure
 June 2 – John Lehmann (died 1987), English poet, writer and editor
 June 7 – Mascha Kaléko (died 1975), German-language poet
 July 21 – Alec Derwent Hope (died 2000), Australian
 August 16 – Edward James (died 1984), English poet and patron of the arts and of surrealism
 September 12 – Louis MacNeice (died 1963), Irish-born
 September 15 – Gunnar Ekelöf (died 1968), Sweden
 October 21 – Nikos Engonopoulos (died 1985), Greek
 October 28 – John Hewitt (died 1987), Irish
 December 14 – R. N. Currey (died 2001), South African-born English
 December 20 – John Joseph Thompson (died 1968), Australian
 Also:
 Susan McGowan (died 2003), Australian
 Vaughan Morgan (died 1987), New Zealand

Deaths
 March 19 – Thomas Bailey Aldrich (born 1836), United States
 April 6 – William Henry Drummond (born 1854), Canada
 April 23 – André Theuriet (born 1833), French poet and novelist
 July 7 – Annie Louisa Walker (born 1836), English and Canadian novelist and poet
 July 31 – Francis Miles Finch (born 1827), United States lawyer and poet
 August 25 – Mary Elizabeth Coleridge, (born 1861), English novelist, poet and teacher who wrote poetry under the pseudonym Anodos (taken from George MacDonald); great-grandniece of Samuel Taylor Coleridge and great niece of Sara Coleridge
 September 6 – Sully Prudhomme (born 1839), French poet and essayist; 1st Nobel Prize winner
 September 8 – Iosif Vulcan (born 1841), Romanian magazine editor, poet, playwright, novelist and cultural figure
 November 13 – Francis Thompson (born 1859), English
 November 28 – Stanisław Wyspiański (born 1869), Polish dramatist, poet and painter
 Also – John Arthur Phillips (born 1842), Canadian)

Awards and honors
 Nobel Prize for Literature: Rudyard Kipling

See also

 20th century in poetry
 20th century in literature
 List of years in poetry
 List of years in literature
 French literature of the 20th century
 Silver Age of Russian Poetry
 Young Poland (Młoda Polska) a modernist period in Polish arts and literature, roughly from 1890 to 1918
 Poetry

Notes

Poetry
20th-century poetry